Poljine is a village in Centar municipality, in town of  Sarajevo, Federation of Bosnia and Herzegovina, Bosnia and Herzegovina.

History
During the 1992-1995 Siege of Sarajevo, Serb forces positioned heavy artillery here and continually bombed the city below. Several attempts have been made by Bosnian Muslim forces to break the siege at this place, with varying success.

Demographics

Ethnic composition, 1991 census

Total: 161

 Serbs - 141 (87.57%)
 ethnic Muslims - 10 (6.21%)
 Croats - 3 (1.86%)
 Yugoslavs - 2 (1.24%)
 others and unknown - 5 (3.10%)

According to the 2013 census, its population was 203.

References

Populated places in Centar, Sarajevo